Spin the Picture is an American game show that aired on the DuMont Television Network.

Format 
The hosts telephoned home viewers to see if they could identify a famous person within a spinning photograph that was accompanied by a verbal clue. Successful identification brought a prize for the viewer. Unsuccessful identification resulted in a consolation prize for the viewer and an increase in the show's jackpot.

Background and schedule 
The show was originally called Cut at the premiere on June 4, 1949, and was renamed Spin the Picture on June 18. The show was hosted by Eddie Dunn, Kathi Norris, and Carl Caruso. 

From June 1949 to January 1950 it was on Saturdays from 8 to 9 p.m. Eastern Time. In January 1959, it was cut to 30 minutes, running from 8 to 8:30 p.m. ET on Saturdays. The final show was broadcast February 4, 1950.  

The show's competition included For Your Pleasure on NBC and Stand By for Crime on ABC.

Episode status
No copies of this show are known to exist.

See also
List of programs broadcast by the DuMont Television Network
List of surviving DuMont Television Network broadcasts
1949-50 United States network television schedule

Bibliography
David Weinstein, The Forgotten Network: DuMont and the Birth of American Television (Philadelphia: Temple University Press, 2004)

References

External links
Spin the Picture at IMDB
DuMont historical website
DuMont Television Network original programming
1949 American television series debuts
1950 American television series endings
1940s American game shows
1950s American game shows
Black-and-white American television shows
Lost television shows